Wadi Tuwa is a wadi, a seasonal waterway, in the Hajar Mountains of Ras Al Khaimah, United Arab Emirates. The wadi is dammed by the Wadi Tuwa Dam.

A popular spot with campers and hikers, Wadi Tuwa is a fertile wadi with many traditional farms dotted throughout its course. Crops cultivated in the wadi include mangoes, dates, onions and tobacco, watered by a number of wells throughout its southeasterly course.

There are a number of petroglyphs, or rock carvings, to be found throughout the wadi, including distinctive leopards, camels, mounted men and horses. These are of a type found in the region, in the Wadi Ejili, Wadi Khadra and Wadi Shawka in particular.

See also 
 List of wadis of the United Arab Emirates

References 

Rivers of the United Arab Emirates
Geography of the Emirate of Ras Al Khaimah